Unforgiving Destiny – The Relentless Pursuit of a Black Marketeer is the 2017 autobiographical account of the 37-year pursuit by authorities in twelve countries to imprison the author, David McMillan. Published simultaneously in the United Kingdom, Europe and the United States on the Amazon platform Createspace.

Synopsis
The biography recounts the smuggling career of David McMillan, beginning in India in the 1970s. After early smuggling operations in Thailand and mafia links in New York City, McMillan comes to the attention of the US Drug Enforcement Administration (DEA), where a career officer becomes obsessed with pursuing the independent smuggler. The officer becomes influential in McMillan’s arrest in Australia, and a decade later in Bangkok. Following McMillan’s escape from a Thai prison, he is in Balochistan (Pakistan) and Afghanistan, where he is attempting to free a kidnapped friend. In Karachi, McMillan is arrested and tortured, and again faces a possible death penalty. However, he arranges his release and travels to Europe where he resumes smuggling. After twenty years as a fugitive, McMillan is arrested in London where the Thai government attempts to have him extradited to face the 23-year-old drug charge. The extradition case fails and McMillan is freed.

Author’s Intent
McMillan’s hope in publishing the autobiography was to “elevate the standard of true-crime writing, to account for the effects upon the women in my life and to throw some light on the little-understood world of the tribal zones along the Afghan border, where so many terrorist groups were formed. Also, to examine a life shattered and rebuilt five times.”

Music influences
McMillan has listed music recordings that, he says, were influential during the 40-year span of the book.

References

External links
Official website, with background to Unforgiving Destiny, photo gallery and interviews
ESCAPE Paperback: 320 pages, Publisher: Mainstream Publishing (3 July 2008) Language English 
UNFORGIVING DESTINY – The Relentless Pursuit of a Black Marketeer:  Amazon UK author and title pages Published 2017; 422 pages, 6”x9” Trade format

2017 non-fiction books
British autobiographies